mod_openpgp is an Apache server module authored by Arturo 'Buanzo' Busleiman that implements access authorization to servers, virtual hosts, or directories when incoming requests' HTTP OpenPGP signatures are valid and known by the local keyring. It's the Apache server companion for the Enigform extension for Mozilla Firefox.

Prior to version 0.2.2, mod_openpgp was known as mod_auth_openpgp.

mod_openpgp participated in the OWASP Summer of Code 2008.

See also

References

External links 
 buanzo.org's Wiki
 
 mod_openpgp at Google Code
 
 

Apache httpd modules
Cryptographic software
OpenPGP
Free software programmed in C
Cross-platform free software
Articles with underscores in the title